The Greek mafia (Greek: Ελληνική μαφία Ellinikí mafía) is the colloquial term used to refer to various organized crime elements originating from Greece. Indigenous organized criminal groups are well-entrenched in the largest Greek urban centers, particularly in Athens.

Large-scaled organized crime, such as the Greek mafia should not be confused with Greek street gangs, who take part in smaller street crime.

In addition to the domestic Greek criminal organizations, the Sicilian Mafia, Camorra, and Albanian, Romanian and Serbian mafia groups have been operating in Greece in collaboration with the domestic criminal syndicates.

Godfathers of the Night
Greek crime bosses are locally described as νονοί της νύχτας (translated as "Godfathers of the night"). Largely operating as owners of nightclubs, Greek crime groups are able to operate their illegal businesses from these locations.

In contrast to the Sicilian mafia or the Albanian mafia, Greek criminal groups follow the same structure organized gangs have within the French Milieu or the Penose in the Netherlands. Domestically, they are largely smaller organized crime cells, usually family-based, who collaborate but from time to time also feud with one another.

There are close to 217 known domestic crime lords operating in the country. Internationally, the smuggling and racketeering practices have a larger reach, and are not necessarily based on Greek nationals alone. With the need to infiltrate and manipulate multiple types of businesses in order to successfully smuggle internationally, more often than not such organisations resemble professional international cartels rather than traditional organised crime groups.

Activities
A substantial number of Greek organised crime groups are centered in Athens. However, many other (semi) organised groups operate throughout other cities, and even villages. Criminal clans can have their origins from all over Greece:  Mafia groups in the bigger cities are especially involved in racketeering, the illegal smuggling of oil, money laundering, weapon and drug trafficking as well as murder.

Criminal groups on the Greek mainland have also profited from the activities of corrupt officials. Arms, narcotics and illegal oil are smuggled by Greek criminal organizations, often in collaboration with Albanian or Russian mafia groups, from local seaports to important destination centers such as the docks of Naples or Antwerp. Outside of the urban centers, the island of Crete is known for having regional family-based crime clans involved in the cultivating and trafficking of marijuana on a domestic as well as an international level. Kidnapping and weapon trafficking are activities of choice as well, often collaborating with the Albanian mafia. An example is the village Zoniana which is a known ground zero for Cretan drug lords, such as the Parasyris family. In general, Greek organised crime groups are active on the Greek mainland, as well as in other parts of Europe. Activity is mainly focused upon the areas of cigarette smuggling and the trafficking of marijuana, hashish and weapons. European cities are deeply affected by Greek organized crime in the form of narcotics smuggling. Recently, under pressure from the European union, Greece, and numerous other European countries, have stepped up their war on smuggling, making numerous arrests and otherwise disabling the organizations in collaboration with European law enforcement agencies.

With Greece holding a large percentage of the world's maritime merchant shipping, a substantial amount of Greek grown marijuana is shipped throughout Europe on a yearly basis. Grown on remote farms and fields, mainly on the island of Crete and the Peloponnese peninsula, it has found its way into the heart of most western and middle-European cities, regardless of efforts made to halt this phenomenon.

Outside Greece

Netherlands 

The Netherlands in particular, with its lenient view of cannabis use, has many dealings with international (and often untraceable) smuggling rings. This is also made possible by the extensive use of maritime merchant ships, and their difficult to regulate and inspect cargo. The "tolerating" laws regarding cannabis, make the selling and usage of marijuana, legal in the Netherlands. However, the cultivation and transportation of cannabis is still illegal. This offers smugglers a strong market with high demand for their product.
it is speculated that for a large part, Greek-based cartels are at work. However, prosecuting such members is difficult due to the non-hierarchical nature of the organisation(s).

North America
North American cities with a large Greek community have traditionally also been home to ethnic Greek criminal organizations, well-known ones being the Velentzas crime family, the Philadelphia Greek Mob, and the Voidonikolas-Georgakopoulos-Leoutsakos Laconian Canadian crime syndicate families. These organizations have secretly operated for decades, and are notoriously powerful.

In the United States, the term "Greek mafia" may include or refer specifically to various Greek American organized crime groups. Notable ethnic Greek or Greek American organized crime groups in the United States include the Philadelphia Greek Mob in Philadelphia, Pennsylvania and the Velentzas crime family in New York City. Greek American crime groups vary in the extent of their connections to Greek mafia groups in Europe; some Greek-American crime groups may be only loosely connected or even completely independent of Greek mafia groups in Europe, while certain Greek-American crime groups may essentially be American extensions of Greek mafia groups in Europe.

Greek members of organised crime have always been good at working with other ethnic groups along with their own local Greek groupings, which can at times give them an advantage over other organisations. There was also a Greek-American presence in the Italian-American Chicago crime family, known as the Outfit. The most senior non-Italian gangster in the Outfit was Gus Alex, whose family emigrated to Chicago from the village of Alpochori in Achaea. The Chicago Outfit, unlike New York City's Five Families, has a long standing tradition, dating back to Al Capone, of allowing non-Italian associates into positions of real importance and power. Gus Alex was the highest ranking non-Italian wiseguy, as he reportedly formed a three-man ruling panel in the late sixties and early seventies. The three-man ruling panel, consisting of a Greek and two Italians, ran the Chicago outfit for an unknown period of time.

The most infamous Greek-American gangster is Michael Thevis, a multi-millionaire pornographer and convicted murderer based in Atlanta, Georgia, but with close  links to the Five Families of New York City and the DeCavalcante crime family of Newark, New Jersey. Thevis' use of unnecessary violence against both real and imagined enemies and competitors was so extreme that he was compared to the character of Tony Montana from the 1983 movie Scarface.

Africa
In Africa, a small Greek crime syndicate ran casinos throughout the region of middle Africa, and in South Africa throughout the 1980s and 1990s. Gambling has always been a staple of Greek organised crime, as well as horse racing, cards, casinos and black market dealings. It is safe to assume that Greek-organised crime is difficult to disintegrate, since these groups form, break-up and reform when it suits their interests. For this reason it is often compared to the Italian Camorra, which at times has worked on a similar model. Greek organised crime relies mainly on smuggling whereas the Italian Camorra relies mainly on extortion and racketeering.

Other countries 
There is reportedly a significant subculture of organised crime within the broader Greek Australian community.

In addition to Cyprus itself, Greek Cypriot crime families are known to operate in the United Kingdom and South Africa.

There is also a presence of organised crime amongst Pontic Greeks. Like Cypriots, Pontic Greeks have their own distinctive traditions, whilst remaining ethnically Greek.

References

External links
http://www.tovima.gr/relatedarticles/article/?aid=125029
http://www.telegraph.co.uk/news/worldnews/europe/greece/2207277/Drug-dealing-shepherds-set-up-Crete-crime-empire.html
Nations Hospitable to Organized Crime

Mafia

Organized crime by ethnic or national origin
Transnational organized crime
Organised crime groups in Australia
Greek-Australian culture
Organized crime groups in Canada
Organised crime groups in the Netherlands
Organised crime groups in South Africa
Organized crime groups in the United States
Organized crime groups in Greece